Jailyn Sue Ford (born June 3, 1994) is an American former professional softball pitcher and first basemen. She played college softball at James Madison and professionally for the Akron Racers and USSSA Pride of the National Pro Fastpitch.

Playing career
Ford played college softball for James Madison from 2013 to 2016 where she was part of the winningest Senior Class in James Madison history, where she also started every game of her college career, either at first base or pitcher. During Ford's time at James Madison, the Dukes won three CAA Regular Season Titles (2013, 2015, 2016), as well as a Tournament Title (2016). 

She was drafted third overall by the Akron Racers and later played for USSSA Pride of National Pro Fastpitch, winning back-to-back titles in 2018 and 2019, being named MVP for the latter series.

Career statistics

References

External links
 

1994 births
Living people
Akron Racers players
James Madison Dukes softball players
James Madison University alumni
People from Hot Springs, Virginia
Softball players from Virginia
Competitors at the 2022 World Games
World Games gold medalists
World Games medalists in softball